Danmarks Næste Topmodel, cycle 4 was the fourth cycle of Danmarks Næste Topmodel. Caroline Fleming, Uffe Buchard, Jesper Thomsen and Oliver Bjerrehuus all remained as judges on the show. Actor and TV-presenter Christian Schaumburg-Müller was added as a new judge for panel. The show began to air on September 19, 2013.

Among with the prizes was a modeling contract with Unique Model Management and the cover spread in COVER magazine Denmark.

The winner was 20-year-old Louise Mørck Mikkelsen from Odense.

Contestants
(ages stated are at start of contest)

Episode summaries

Episode 1
First eliminated: Maria Erfurt Høj Holmgaard, Simone Skov Jensen & Zandra Strobel Brandi Hansen
Photo of the week: Louise Mørck Mikkelsen	
Second eliminated: Alma Amila Rasmussen & Mathilde Almind Jensen

Episode 2
Photo of the week: Catrine Juhl	
Bottom two: Klara Lau & Sille Rieck
Eliminated: Klara Lau

Episode 3
Challenge winners: Josephine Bach Jacobsen, Caroline Hollitsch & Catrine Juhl	
Photo of the week: Caroline Hollitsch	
Bottom two/eliminated: Petronelle Schultz & Sille Rieck

Episode 4
Challenge winners: Andrea Helander	& Louise Mørck Mikkelsen	
Video of the week: Anne Holth	
Bottom two: Mette Christensen & Rebecca Rovsing	
Eliminated: Rebecca Rovsing

Episode 5
Challenge winner: Amanda Elfving
Photo of the week: Caroline Hollitsch	
Bottom two: Amalie Egemose & Andrea Helander		
Eliminated: Andrea Helander

Episode 6
Challenge winner: Amanda Elfving
Photo of the week: Caroline Hollitsch	
Bottom three: Amalie Egemose, Josephine Bach Jacobsen & Mette Christensen		 		
Eliminated: Amalie Egemose & Mette Christensen

Episode 7
Challenge winner: Anne Kathrine Petersen Bach	
Photo of the week: Catrine Juhl	  	
Bottom two: Anne Holth & Caroline Sebber Colfelt 		
Eliminated: Anne Holth

Episode 8
Challenge winner: Caroline Sebber Colfelt
Photo of the week: Caroline Sebber Colfelt
Bottom two: Caroline Hollitsch & Josephine Bach Jacobsen			 		
Eliminated: Josephine Bach Jacobsen

Episode 9
Challenge winner: Louise Mørck Mikkelsen	
Photo of the week: Caroline Hollitsch
Bottom two/eliminated: Amanda Elfving & Caroline Sebber Colfelt

Episode 10
Challenge winner: Catrine Juhl
Eliminated outside of judging panel: Anne Kathrine Petersen Bach	
Final three: Caroline Hollitsch, Catrine Juhl & Louise Mørck Mikkelsen	
Denmark's Next Top Model: Louise Mørck Mikkelsen

Summaries

Results table

 The contestant won photo of the week
 The contestant was eliminated outside the judging panel
 The contestant was in danger of elimination
 The contestant was eliminated
 The contestant won the competition

Photo shoot guide
Episode 1 photo shoot: Promotional pictures in army outfits (casting)
Episode 2 photo shoot: High end hipsters in Kødbyen
Episode 3 photo shoot: TRESemmé hair campaign
Episode 4 music video: Romance with Johnson
Episode 5 photo shoot: Worldly women eating food
Episode 6 photo shoot: Royal ballet with male dancers
Episode 7 photo shoot: Sight-seeing in Paris
Episode 8 photo shoot: Car washing babes
Episode 9 photo shoot: Flower beauty shots
Episode 10 photo shoot: Covers for COVER magazine

Post–Topmodel careers

Sille Rieck signed with Le Management. She has taken a couple of test shots and appeared on the cover and editorials for Femina August 2017. 
Rebecca Rovsing has taken a couple of test shots and modeled for Nette Design, Pearls by BK,... She retired from modeling in 2018.
Andrea Helander signed with Unique Models, Le Management, ICE Genetics in Cape Town, Brooks Modeling Agency in Amsterdam and Modellink Agency in Gothenburg. She has taken a couple of test shots and appeared on an editorials for Cover magazine, In Beaut magazine,... She has modeled for Mango Skin EDP, Orgreen Optics, Odd Molly, Hunkydory Stockholm, NA-KD Fashion, Volvo, MODO Eyewear, H&M, MQ Marqet, Sanne Alexandra, BeautyAct, Kicks Sverige, Åhléns, Hairtalk Sweden,...
Anne Holth has taken a couple of test shots and appeared on an editorials for Jute magazine. She retired from modeling in 2015.
Josephine Jacobsen signed with Unique Models, WOW Casting agency and APM Models in New York City. She has taken a couple of test shots and appeared on an editorials for Nylon. She has modeled for Sina Noori S/S 2015, NYLON Shop, MAC Cosmetics, JoRocco jewelry, ZEN Nightclub, AdrianaOnline.com, Ettore Bilotta A/W 2016, Saint Tropez clothing,... Jacobsen has walked in the fashion shows during Copenhagen Fashion Week 2014 such as Jonatan Härngren, Munthe, MI-NO-RO, Vero Moda,... She retired from modeling in 2020.
Caroline Sebber Colfelt signed with Inter Agency. She has taken a couple of test shots and walked in fashion shows during Copenhagen Fashion Week such as Jade Cropper SS23, Remain A/W 2023,... She has appeared on an editorials for MY magazine #14 and modeled for Mette Frejvald, Chamoi Vintage Store, Wood Wood, Jade Cropper, Gabi Gamél,... Beside modelling, Sebber is also appeared in the music videos of "Boing Boing" and "Back Up Top" by The Bird, and own of a clothing line called Broken Uniform. 
Amanda Elfving signed with Unique Models. She has taken a couple of test shots and walked in fashion shows for DSKD Fashion Bachelor during Copenhagen Fashion Week 2018. She has also modeled for Mette Frejvald, Sara Ditlev, Sandermann, Alix Habran Jensen, Feathery Fire Couture, Liselotte Hornstrup, Mads Kodbøl Vindelev Jørgensen,...
Anne-Kathrine Petersen Bach signed with Le Management. She has taken a couple of test shots, walked in fashion show for Kolding Designskole and modeled for Alexandra Frankø. She retired from modeling in 2016.
Catrine Juhl has taken a couple of test shots and modeled for Veras Vintage, Grocery Copenhagen,... She retired from modeling in 2020.
Caroline Hollitsch signed with Unique Models. She has taken a couple of test shots and walked in the fashion show for Object clothing. She has modeled for Salling, Naja Lauf,... She retired from modeling in 2017.
Louise Mikkelsen has collected her prizes and signed with Unique Models. She is also signed with Le Management, Elite Model Management in Los Angeles & Miami, Body London Model Agency in London, Chic Model Management in Sydney, International Model Management in Brussels, Metropolitan Models in Paris, Mad Models Management in Barcelona, Wonderwall Management in Milan, Boss Models in Cape Town, Trump Model Management in New York City, Supa Model in London, Mega Models Agency in Berlin and Two Management in Los Angeles. She appeared on the cover and editorials for Cover magazine, Det Nye, Acute magazine, Grazia Turkey, Skøn magazine, Alt For Damerne, Femina, Nord magazine, Couch magazine, Elle Australia, Glamcult, Elle Sweden, Revs magazine, Grazia Italia, Bast magazine, Indooroopilly magazine, Brigitte, Oyster, Vogue España,... She has walked in the fashion shows for Baum und Pferdgarten, Bitte Kai Rand, By Malene Birger, Benedikte Utzon, Designers Remix, Lovechild 1979, Maikel Tawadros, Designers Nest, Munthe, Fonnesbech,... She is also been shooting print works for Bitte Kai Rand, A.J.L. Madhouse, Spell Bridal, Yeojin Bae, Resort by Fleur, Vintage Havana, Mister Zimi, Surf Expo, Cleobella, Faithful the Brand, Luv AJ, L Space, Ahoy Trader, Emma Mulholland × Pared, Peter Alexander, Stevie May, Benedikte Utzon, Urban Sport, Ryan Kenny × She Made Me, Stoned Immaculate,...

References

Danmarks Næste Topmodel
2013 Danish television seasons